Nixon vs. Kennedy (Richard Nixon vs. John F. Kennedy) can refer to:

1960 United States presidential election, when Nixon and Kennedy were the candidates from the two major parties
any of the 1960 United States presidential debates between the two
"Nixon vs. Kennedy" (Mad Men), the penultimate episode of the first season of the AMC television series Mad Men

See also
Nixon v. Fitzgerald, an early 1980s U.S. Supreme Court case involving Richard Nixon